Biohackers is a German techno-thriller television series created by Christian Ditter that premiered on Netflix on 20 August 2020. A week after its release, the series was renewed for a second season, which was released on 9 July 2021.

Synopsis
Mia Akerlund is a medical student at the University of Freiburg, where she meets Jasper, a talented biology student, and Niklas, his somewhat strange roommate. She is very interested in biohacking technology and becomes involved in the world of illegal genetic experimentation. Mia is also trying to investigate the cause of her brother's death. When she learns of breakthrough biohacking research results which have landed in the wrong hands, Mia has to decide whether to protect her friends or avenge her brother's death.

Cast and characters

Main
 Luna Wedler as Emma "Mia Akerlund" Engels
 Jessica Schwarz as Professor Tanja Lorenz
 Thomas Prenn as Niklas
 Adrian Julius Tillmann as Jasper
 Jing Xiang as Chen-Lu
 Caro Cult as Lotta
 Sebastian Jakob Doppelbauer as Ole

Recurring
 Edith Saldanha as Monique
 Zeynep Bozbay as Petra Eller
 Benno Fürmann as Andreas Winter
 Thomas Kretschmann as Baron von Fürstenberg (season 2)

Episodes

Season 1 (2020)

Season 2 (2021)

Production
In addition to the original location at the University of Freiburg, the majority of the first season was filmed in studios in Munich. Principal photography began in May 2019 and wrapped up in September 2019.

The production was partially funded with at least €400,000 from the German Motion Picture Fund and the Bavarian media promotion company FilmFernsehFonds Bayern, which had also partly funded the Netflix series Dark.

Release
The first season's six episodes were originally scheduled to be released on 30 April 2020. However, Netflix decided to postpone the launch due to the public's focus on the spread of COVID-19, as some scenes from the show could be misconstrued as references to the pandemic. 20 August 2020 was selected as the new release date.

Reception
In a balanced review of the series, Elsa Sotiriadis of Singularity Hub writes, "...the unconventional pieces sometimes move smoothly together and sometimes clash, but the plot is glued together with lots of visually appealing synthetic biology experiments and bioluminescent matter of diverse natures." Additionally, she says, "...don't expect the show to offer deep scientific insights or riveting character arcs, because biohacking is only the backdrop of a revenge plot that feels somewhat rushed."

The journal Science published a positive review of the show, noting that it accurately presents laboratory scenes of complex molecular biology, though these are necessarily rushed. The review also considered the dialogue about gene therapies and antidotes to be consistent with how RNA interference therapies work. The show also addresses many concerns about genomic data and genetic engineering, and the motivating drive behind do-it-yourself biology.

References

External links
 
 
 

2020 German television series debuts
2020s German drama television series
2020s science fiction television series
German science fiction television series
German-language Netflix original programming
Techno-thrillers
Television shows set in Germany
Thriller television series